Xavier Vallès Trias (born 4 September 1979) is a Spanish water polo player who competed in the 2008 Summer Olympics. and 2012 Summer Olympics

See also
 List of World Aquatics Championships medalists in water polo

References

External links
 

1979 births
Living people
Spanish male water polo players
Olympic water polo players of Spain
Water polo players at the 2008 Summer Olympics
Water polo players at the 2012 Summer Olympics
World Aquatics Championships medalists in water polo
Mediterranean Games silver medalists for Spain
Mediterranean Games medalists in water polo
Competitors at the 2005 Mediterranean Games
Competitors at the 2013 Mediterranean Games
21st-century Spanish people